is a Japanese actress. She played Kaori Minami in Battle Royale.

She is represented with Ohta Production.

References

External links
 Mai Sekiguchi - Ohta Pro
 
 

Living people
Japanese actresses
1983 births